Champorado or tsampurado (from ) is a sweet chocolate rice porridge in Philippine cuisine.

Ingredients
It is traditionally made by boiling sticky rice with tablea (traditional tablets of pure ground roasted cocoa beans). It can be served hot or cold, usually for breakfast or merienda, with milk (or coconut milk) and sugar to taste. It is usually eaten as is, but a common pairing is with salted dried fish (daing or tuyo).

Tinughong is a variant of champorado in the Visayan-speaking regions of the Philippines. It is usually made by boiling sticky rice with sugar instead of tablea. Coffee or milk are sometimes added to it.

History
Its history can be traced back from the Spanish colonial period of the Philippines. During the galleon trade between Mexico and the Philippines, Mexican traders brought the knowledge of making champurrado to the Philippines (on the way back, they introduced tuba in Mexico). Through the years, the recipe changed; Filipinos eventually found ways to make the Mexican champurrado a Philippine champorado by replacing masa with sticky rice.

See also
 List of porridges
 Tsokolate
 Chocolate industry in the Philippines

References

Philippine rice dishes
Guamanian desserts
Porridges
Chocolate desserts
Milk dishes
Christmas food